Geoff Neil (3 May 1909 – 7 June 1974) was an  Australian rules footballer who played with St Kilda in the Victorian Football League (VFL).

Notes

External links 

1909 births
1974 deaths
Australian rules footballers from New South Wales
St Kilda Football Club players